Prestwichia aquatica is a species of fairyfly.

References 

Trichogrammatidae
Insects described in 1864
Taxa named by John Lubbock, 1st Baron Avebury